Randvere may refer to several places in Estonia:

Randvere, Harju County, village in Viimsi Parish, Harju County
Randvere, Lääne-Saare Parish, village in Lääne-Saare Parish, Saare County
Randvere, Laimjala Parish, village in Laimjala Parish, Saare County